Sing Sing Nights is a 1934 American film directed by Lewis D. Collins, based on the 1927 novel by American Author Harry Stephen Keeler.

Plot summary 
 Three men have been convicted of the same murder of the, admittedly, quite reprehensible Floyd Cooper, and sit on death row awaiting execution the following morning. However, only one bullet could have struck the victim first, so only one of the three men is actually guilty of murder, since "the other two shot into a corpse," and so must be innocent; but which two?  Professor Varney's machine, a kind of lie detector, will determine who is guilty as each man tells the story of how he came to know, hate, and kill the victim.

Cast 
Conway Tearle as Floyd Cooper
Ferdinand Gottschalk as Prof. Varney
Hardie Albright as Howard Trude
Jameson Thomas as Robert McCaigh
Berton Churchill as Gov. Duane
Boots Mallory as Ellen Croft
Mary Doran as Anne McCaigh
Henry Kolker as Kurt Nordon
Lotus Long as Li Sung
Richard Tucker as Attorney General
George Baxter as Sergei Krenwicz

Soundtrack

External links 

1934 films
American romantic drama films
American mystery films
American crime films
American war films
1930s English-language films
American black-and-white films
Films based on American novels
1934 romantic drama films
1930s mystery films
1930s crime films
Films directed by Lewis D. Collins
Monogram Pictures films
1930s American films